The Danakil Depression is the northern part of the Afar Triangle or Afar Depression in Ethiopia, a geological depression that has resulted from the divergence of three tectonic plates in the Horn of Africa.

Geology
The Danakil Depression lies at the triple junction of three tectonic plates and has a complex geological history. It has developed as a result of Africa and Asia moving apart, causing rifting and volcanic activity. Erosion, inundation by the sea, the rising and falling of the ground have all played their part in the formation of this depression. Sedimentary rocks such as sandstone and limestone are unconformably overlain by basalt which resulted from extensive lava flows.

IUGS geological heritage site
In respect of it demonstrating 'the ongoing birth of an ocean witnessed through tectonics and volcanism in an extreme evaporite arid environment', the International Union of Geological Sciences (IUGS) included 'The Danakil Rift depression and its volcanism' in its assemblage of 100 'geological heritage sites' around the world in a listing published in October 2022. The organisation defines an IUGS Geological Heritage Site as 'a key place with geological elements and/or processes of international scientific relevance, used as a reference, and/or with a substantial contribution to the development of geological sciences through history.'

Location

The area is often referred to as the cradle of humanity; in 1974 Donald Johanson and his colleagues found the famous Australopithecus afarensis fossil Lucy, which has been dated 3.2 million years old and many other fossils of ancient hominins have been uncovered here, prompting many palaeontologists to propose that this area is where the human species first evolved.

Features

The Danakil Depression is the hottest place on Earth in terms of year-round average temperatures. Here, the Awash River dries up in a chain of salt lakes such as Lake Afrera, never reaching the Indian Ocean.

Mount Ayelu is the westernmost and older of the two volcanoes at the southern end of the Danakil Depression. The other active volcano, Erta Ale, is one of several crater lakes of lava bubbling from the Earth's mantle. Additionally, the area contains the Dallol sulfur springs, or hot springs. These wet environments at the Danakil Depression are being investigated to help understand how life might arise on other planets and moons. Many microorganisms living here are extremophilic microbes of a major interest to astrobiologists. Nonetheless, in October 2019, scientists reported that terrestrial lifeforms, including extreme forms of archaea microorganisms, were not found to exist in the very hot, acidic and salty conditions present in some parts of the Danakil Depression.

Hot springs 
Among the geological points of interest to tourists are the hydrothermal system of Dallol and the Yellow Lake.

Gaet'ale Pond is a small hypersaline lake located over a tectonic hot spring in the Danakil Depression (Afar, Ethiopia). With a salinity of 43%, Gaet'ale Pond is the saltiest water body on Earth. The pond was created in January 2005 following an earthquake, according to residents of the Ahmed'ela village, which reactivated the hot spring.

See also 
 Afar Triangle
 Danakil Desert

References

External links
 Danakil Depression – video clip from BBC Planet Earth

Afar Region
Deserts of Ethiopia
Deserts of Eritrea
First 100 IUGS Geological Heritage Sites